The 1999 Copa Colsanitas doubles was the doubles event of the second edition of the Copa Colsanitas; a WTA Tier IV tournament and the most prestigious women's tennis tournament held in Colombia and Hispanic America. Janette Husárová and Paola Suárez were the defending champions but only Suárez competed that year with Laura Montalvo.

Montalvo and Suárez lost in the final 6–4, 7–6 against Seda Noorlander and Christína Papadáki.

Seeds

Draw

Qualifying

Seeds

Qualifiers
 ''' Jelena Dokić /  Inés Gorrochategui

Qualifying draw

External links
 1999 Copa Colsanitas Doubles Draw

Copa Colsanitas
Copa Colsanitas